This is a list of the characters from the 2008 Nicktoons Network series, Speed Racer: The Next Generation.

Main characters

Speed Racer Jr. 
Voice Actor: Kurt Csolak

The main character of the series, Speed Racer Jr. (or just "Speed" for short) is the second son of the original Speed Racer from the 1967 Japanese anime series. He was hidden from the public by both his father and Trixie, to protect him. Speed Sr. knew that his enemies would do anything to get their hands on the plans for the Mach Six, even harm his younger son. However, the story goes into further depth in the "Family Reunion" trilogy when it is revealed that after Trixie Tredwell Racer, Speed Sr.'s wife and Speed's mother, became corrupted with hatred for her husband blaming him for the accident that killed her father and took over her father's company known as the Committee, Speed Sr. only hid his second son away in an orphanage so that he will be protected from Trixie's warped influence. Speed grew up in an orphanage for the majority of his life. His father had left him a special key and a red racing bandanna, both of which he kept with him for sentimental reasons. He is quite shy, but being behind the wheel brings out the best in him. Unlike his father before him, Speed doesn't get into any perilous trouble of fighting thugs and gang members, therefore instead of fighting (due to the fact that he doesn't know hand-to-hand combat), Speed uses his racing skill to get away from bad guys. Although in "Together We Stand, pt. 3," he is shown to use some hand-to-hand combat (which Speed Jr. calls his fighting style the Cabbage Patch) against a guard who tries to capture Connor. He is the number one racer at the academy according to the episode "The Secrets of the Engine, pt. 1".
Speed's skills on the racetrack are on par with those of the top ranking students at the Racing Academy. His skills are somewhat inherited, with Speed knowing the right timing, and maneuvers during racing. Despite his amazing talent, he is generally quite modest about his abilities and claims that his maneuvers are a result of instinct rather than skill. He is not in it for money or fame - he just wants to be "the best in the world", and to have fun. He has also expressed interest in going into counterespionage alongside his father after graduation. His best friends are two of the school's students, Connor and Lucy. He believes that his father would still be a great racers with or without the Mach 5. Together, they work as a team both inside and outside school grounds. Speed also has close bonds with his older brother, X, and their uncle Spritle. In "The Return, pt. 1" he happily reunites with his father, Speed Racer Sr., and the two of them immediately become close.

Casually, Speed wears a blue long sleeve shirt with red stars embroidered on both sleeves. When racing, he dons a white and blue racing helmet with a large, stylized red "M" (which stands for Mifune Motors) atop the visor and a racing jacket that contains several references to the original anime and manga series.  The jacket's collar is red, an homage to the red racing ascot tie the original Speed Racer had worn. The jacket's color scheme is mostly blue with white accents, a homage to the color scheme of the original Speed's outfit. Lastly, the jacket features several patches which contain references to the Japanese show, including the names such as "Go" and "Daisuke", the Japanese names of Speed and Pops Racer, respectively. At formal events such as the school dance, he wears a white shirt and light brown jacket and pants. He and X both have an appearance closer to Trixie than to the original Speed Racer (though Speed has his father's eyes). It has been referenced since the pilot episode that he has had a crush on Lucy, but despite the episodes leading to it, he is too shy to do anything about it and cannot tell Lucy how he feels about her. That is until the recent filler episode "Gotcha" where near the end the two confessed their feelings for one another and shared a kiss, which much to their dismay, the whole school was able to see.

X Racer 
Voice Actor: Robbie Sublett (Season 1), Bryan Tyler (Season 2)

He is the oldest son of the original Speed Racer, and the former number one racer at the Racing Academy. Known for his skills and abilities on the track, he is slick, handsome, and popular among the girls at school. While X appears to be a tough guy on the outside, he has a more kind-hearted personality than he leads other people to believe. He is initially shocked to find out that Speed is his long lost younger brother, but becomes more accepting of the fact and develops a tough, brotherly bond with him and is always there to give advice. But just because Speed's his brother, doesn't mean X is willing to go easy on him. They are constantly each other's rivals on the track. He usually hangs out with Jared, Jesse, and his girlfriend Annalise, but as the series goes on, he begins to hang out with Speed, Conor, and Lucy. Later, in "The Great Escape, pt. 3", Annalise breaks up with him. Also in "The Secrets of the Engine, pt. 3," X decides to go pro on Turbo McCalister's team after being complimented by Turbo for saving Speed during the race. In "The Return, pt. 1" he shows resentment toward his father when he finally returns and even warns Speed not to get too close to him. Soon later in "The Hourglass, pt. 3," from what he heard from Speed and Annalise, he seems to have a change of heart about Speed Sr. During the "Racing With the Enemy" trilogy, his relationships with his father and brother are put to the ultimate test when he is manipulated by Lord Bowler and the Committee into thinking that his father never actually wanted to change the world and was only sabotaging the Committee for selfish reasons. In "Racing with the Enemy, Part 2," he reveals to Speed that he has become the Red Bolt and joined the Shadow Committee clearly still believing that they are trying to make the world a better place. When he, Speed, Alpha, and Chim-Chim are all transported to an alternate dimension, where the Shadow Committee run the Racer Academy as a military school in "The Shadow World" trilogy, he begins to see the Committee's true colors and apologizes to Speed realizing that his brother was right.

Little is known about where X had been raised after his father disappeared, but it is implied in the "Family Reunion" trilogy that he was raised by his uncle Spritle and that he simply did not remember Speed after their father took him to an orphanage. X wears a grey shirt and has a large X tattoo on his right arm.  He drives his version of the Shooting Star and after "The Hunt for the Truth pt. 3" he drives Racer X's original Shooting Star.

Spritle Racer  
Voice Actor: Peter Fernandez (Season 1), Greg Abbey (Season 2)

He, Sparky, Speed Sr., Trixie, and Rex are the only characters from the original series. Spritle now runs the Academy founded by the Racer Family as the headmaster. While he is Speed and X's uncle and provides fatherly wisdom from time to time, he never bends the school rules for his nephews' sake. He is shown as a matured adult in contrast to the mischievous child in the original series, therefore, Spritle doesn't seem to be suspicious of anybody around him. Spritle remains clueless about Zile Zazic's evil scheme and usually sits behind the scenes during the climax of a given episode. He has started to become suspicious of Zile as of the episode, "Money Problems". He also helps Speed and the others rescue the Chezco chamber from Zile in "Secrets of the Engine, pt. 2." So far in the second season, Spritle seems to be the only character who does not have any interaction with Speed Sr. when he returns since he does not appear in part 1 of the season 2 premiere and seems to be unaware of the fact. Recently he is shown to have some knowledge of his older brother's activities, as seen when he mentions that his nephews might be able to serve alongside their father. Spritle seems to be the most cautious of his family, as shown when he learns that Speed Jr. and X ran off on a dangerous mission and instantly compares their foolish actions with those of his own brother.

Lucy 
Voice Actor: Sahra Mellesse

Of Speed and Conor, Lucy is the sensible one of the group. She wears a light blue mechanic's uniform with the Racing Academy logo on it. Strict, open-minded, and studious, she often assists Conor with his work, but is a little bit bossy at times. While she is generally a friendly and calm individual, Lucy will occasionally insult Conor and bombard Speed with criticism. She always makes up for it by helping her friends. Lucy has a crush on Speed, and displays jealousy toward any other girl (notably Elsa Zazic - Annalise's blonde and beautiful cousin) who shows Speed affection in "Be Cruel To Your School" and "The Dance". It is still unknown whether Speed knows these feelings, but since "The Dance", it is implied that he does.

Trixie, Speed Sr.'s girlfriend, can be compared to Lucy, because her attitude and role in the series are very similar. She also shares Trixie's tendency to get very jealous when another girl hits on Speed or if she feels she's being ignored. Lucy doesn't appear to drive her own car, but in some episodes, she pilots a helicopter transformed from X's ejector seat. It is later revealed that Lucy idolizes Trixie as the world's greatest racing strategist, and aspires to be just like her one day.

Conor 
Voice Actor: Carter Jackson

A poor racer, but a great mechanic, Conor is good friends with Speed and Lucy. His most defining characteristic is that he is a huge fan of Speed Racer Sr. to the point of obsession. He often cosplays in his Speed Racer outfit, has tons of memorabilia and merchandise in his dorm room and knows everything that there is to know about him and the Mach Five. His nerdish, embarrassing, hyperactive behavior and interests prevent him from making many friends, when Speed accepts him as one, he is eternally grateful and proves to be a reliable companion. Conor clearly has a crush on Annalise despite of her being completely out of his league, and never having the feeling returned.

Chim-Chim 

Conor built this robot based on the pet chimpanzee the headmaster used to own. He is entirely loyal to Conor. Chim-Chim has a seemingly unlimited number of uses, from transforming into a scooter, to storing anything inside the compartment in his stomach, to repairing the Mach 6 while it is moving. However, that doesn't stop him from eating necessary car parts or creating the usual kind of mischief all monkeys make. His belly has a lining of lead material, encasing the contents within the storage area, and protecting them from radiation, and magnetic deterioration. His control panel is behind the lid on his back. As a pantomime character, like R2-D2, he talks in electronic beeps.

In "The Dance", he was modified into a date for Conor named "Chimantha". Conor's rival Ronald built a monkey similar to Chim-Chim, which he named Mich-Mich. Chim-Chim was disabled by an avalanche in "Comet Run, pt. 2", but uploaded his brain onto Lucy's camera. By the end of "Comet Run, pt. 3", his brain was reuploaded into his repaired body.

Annalise Zazic 
Voice Actor: Michal Friedman (credited as Michal The Girl)

Annalise was X's girlfriend, and the second best racer in the school. A spoiled, rich, selfish, whiny, material girl, Annalise gets whatever she wants from her father, Zile Zazic, since they come from a rich family. She immediately dislikes Speed upon meeting him, since he's the new kid who gets picked upon in every school, and calls him "Noob" and "Speed Bump". Her discovery of him being X's brother only heightens her animosity for him, as he could be a possible competition for her own boyfriend, and becomes one of Speed's top enemies. The most recent episodes reveal the beginning of a shift in Annalise's and X's relationship, as X's friendship with Speed starts to interfere. She appeared to be nice in the episode "The Note". X's relationship with her affects her attitude when Speed is around. Snake Oiler, Speed Sr's racing rival in the original series can be compared to Annalise. Her car number, 12, and attitude are very similar. She breaks up with X in part 3 of "The Great Escape" and was placed in charge of her dad's company. She was forced by the Shadow Committee into completing what her father started by taking the Mach 6 apart to learn its secrets.

The second season marks a change in her when she is forcibly paired with Speed and X for a team race. While practicing with them for the competition, she warms up to the group, and ultimately sacrifices her own car to save the Mach 6 when the Shadow Committee makes their move to steal it. Afterwards, she seems to have made amends with Speed, X, Conor, and Lucy and begins hanging out with them on a regular basis. While still being spoiled and materialistic, she now puts her friends first and is willing to risk her own life to help the others. In the episode The Hunt for the Truth pt. 3 it is revealed that her car is named the "Spoiled Brat".

When Speed and X change the past using the time-travel device, their actions result in Annalise's mother divorcing her father 16 years prior to the main story. In this new timeline Annalise was taken from her father at a young age, and as a result she is shown to be noticeably kinder to her friends in the present. Despite not having custody of his daughter in the current reality, Zile built an android duplicate of Annalise to act as his mindless servant.

Speed Racer Sr.
Voice Actor: Peter Fernandez (Season 1), Greg Abbey (Season 2)

Speed Racer Sr. is the father of Speed and X, which makes him the third known cast member from the 1967 Japanese show to appear here. He first appeared for a brief moment in the episode "The Note." He states that he is not able to see Speed and X now, but he hopes to see them soon. They currently know that Speed Racer is not dead or missing, but is waiting for the right time to meet them face-to-face, when the time comes. His biggest role in the series so far is in "Plot for Teacher" during a flashback scene, where he is shown half-obscured in shadow, driving the Mach 5. He makes a fully revealed appearance at the very end of the season finale, "Secrets of the Engine, pt. 3", where he shares a hug with Speed Jr. He also plays a major role in the season 2 premiere, "The Return, pt. 1," where he reunites with X and Speed and helps them get the Mach 6 back from Zile. However he leaves them again shortly after saying that he has "unfinished business" to take care of and gives them a phone in order to contact X and Speed whenever possible. He then comes back for a brief moment in "Together We Stand, pt. 3" to warn Speed, X, and their friends telling them to protect the Mach 6. It is revealed in "The Hourglass, Part 3" that he is actually undercover as a scientist who works for the Shadow Committee at the Alpha Academy. He then does not appear again until "The Hunt for Truth, pt. 2" in a message he left for X and Speed claiming that he and everyone else at Alpha Academy were forced to leave before it was destroyed by the Shadow Committee and gives them directions to his current whereabouts. X and Speed find him and rescue him in "The Hunt for Truth, pt. 3," and he seems to be actually staying this time. So far in the second season of the series, Speed Racer is shown to have a closer bond with Speed than with X possibly due to the fact that X shows resentment towards him for disappearing for so long.

Minor characters

Rex Racer Sr.
Voice Actor: Sean Schemmel

Known most commonly as Racer X, Rex Racer is the older brother of Speed Racer Sr. and Spritle from the original series, and the namesake of his nephew, X Racer. After Speed Jr. and his brother travel back in time to prevent their mother from creating the Shadow Committee, Racer X reappears in the present as a disheveled old man researching the conspiracy created by Zile Zazic. He stumbles onto Zile's plot to recreate the time-traveling Hourglass Part for the Mach 6, but his brother dismisses his claims as the ramblings of a lunatic. When Zile kidnaps the Racer Family and tries to eliminate them, they are saved by the timely arrival of X and Speed Jr. Realizing his older sibling was telling the truth all along, Speed Sr. apologizes to Rex and the brothers make up.

Jared and Jesse Deucey
Voice Actor: Michael Sinterniklaas

A pair of twins who are part of X's student entourage, Jared and Jesse act as a team, and share the rank as the third best racers in the school. Normally rude and unpleasant, they often act as Annalise's bullish lackeys. While they do their best to get the job done, both twins are equally incompetent. On the track, Jared and Jesse are a fearsome team. Although they race together in a single vehicle, the actual car has the ability to split into two pieces which both of them can operate separately for periods of time. They use this technique to surround a single opponent from both sides on the race track. They have both raced several times in the series and have been bumped off the race track each time. It is revealed in "The Return, pt. 3" that they were employed by the Trixie and the Shadow Committee to spy on Speed and the gang.

Season 2 reveals that the twins' last name is Deucey, implying a relationship to the original series' Ace Deucey.

Stan Gibbon
Voice Actor: David Zen Mansley

Stan is Zile's personal assistant and second-in-command, despite being clumsy and dimwitted most of the time.  His large, monstrous size and gentle composure almost makes him look like a jolly giant, often getting in the way of the evil plans he is supposed to carry out.  He is overly polite to everyone, and is deeply apologetic whenever he disobeys his boss.  However, Stan is still serious about the job, and his mind is always on Zile's side. In the episode "Comet Run, Part 3", it is revealed that his full name is Stan Jr. At the end of Season 1, he is seen running from the police with Zile Zazic. In the Season 2 premiere, he and Zile are both arrested and put in jail. He is then put under house arrest at the Racer Academy with Zile in "The Hour Glass, Part 1."

Armand Aniskov 
Voice Actor: David Zen Mansley

Professor Aniskov is an instructor at the Racing Academy who teaches the class on offensive driving techniques. Stern and aloof, he never shows any signs of favoritism, and treats all of his students with the same air of indifference. Aniskov is probably one of the academy's more critical instructors, and is not particularly well-liked by any of his students because of strict personality and unpleasant demeanor. His cynical behavior appears to spread beyond the student body, as he once made a snide remark towards Headmaster Spritle after Speed's first qualifying race.

Susan Winn 
Voice Actor: Mami Kimura

Susan Winn is an intelligent and level-headed woman who teaches the class on defensive driving techniques at the Racing Academy. Professor Winn is generally much kinder and more accepting of her students than Professor Aniskov, and is respected because of this. While displaying a sense of strict guidelines and acceptable conduct in her classes, she is a very fair individual.

She is handicapped, and travels around in a sleek, motorized wheel-chair. Her handicap was explained in "Plot for Teacher", in deadly car crash that she was caught in between Speed Racer Sr., Captain Terror, and Damian Russ, the last person who saw Speed before his disappearance. While Damian had not caused the crash and even rescued her from the wreckage, she believed he was responsible for her handicap, and never forgave him since.

Damian Russ 
Voice Actor: Unknown

A veteran racer and old friend of the original Speed Racer, Damian Russ first appears as a guest lecturer at Racer Academy in "Plot for Teacher" during Season 1. During this time it is revealed that he and Susan Winn were involved in a secret mission to save Speed Racer and his son from Captain Terror several years before the main story. The situation resulted in an accident that left Susan handicapped, an incident that she personally blames him for to this very day. After helping out Speed and friends, Damian begins to earn the trust of the group.

He does not appear again until "The Hunt for Truth, Part 3 " during Season 2 when it is revealed that he and Speed Sr. are actively involved in the struggle against the Shadow Committee, performing secret missions and going undercover in an attempt to take down the organization from both inside and out. In the episode "Racing with the Enemy pt. 1" he helps plant bombs inside the Shadow Committees headquarters, but their attempts are thwarted by none other than X.

Dr. Andre Chezko/Sparky 

Voice Actor: Sean Schemmel

Dr. Chezko appears in the last episode trilogy in the first season. He is an absent-minded Russian scientist who was an old friend of Speed's father, and who he collaborated with in inventing an energy chamber that, when added to the Mach 6, would one day allow it to run without gas. When Speed develops the Mach 6 after all those years, he visits him and together they try to install it in the car, make it run successfully, and keep it out of Zile's hands.

In the last episode, he is revealed to be none other than the Racer family's engineer, Sparky- his Russian accent and whole personality is a farce, in order to stay in hiding. At the end, he leaves the Academy campus with the goal of mass-producing the chamber for other cars.

Alpha Leader 

Voice Actor: Yuri Lowenthal

Alpha attends the Alpha Academy, Racer Academy's rival school. He makes his very first appearance in "Together We Stand, pt. 3" when he first meets Speed, X, Conor, Lucy, and Annalise. Like Speed at Racer Academy, he appears to be the best racer at his school and is always determined to win any race fairly and without cheating as shown in "The Hunt for Truth, pts. 1 and 2." He and the other students at the school appear to be unaware that their school is run by the Shadow Committee in order to hide "Project: Hourglass." Alpha drives the Alpha 1.

He plays his first major role in the series so far in "The Hunt for Truth" trilogy when he is forced to use the device the Shadow Committee made against Speed and the Mach 6. He disables the part installed in his car and turns against Mustache in order to help Speed rescue Lucy when she is kidnapped by his former coach and headmaster. In "The Hunt for Truth, pt. 3," he helps Speed, X, Annalise, and Conor with their mission to rescue Speed Sr., but he sacrifices his chances of getting away from the "scorpion-cars" and goes missing. In "Racing with the Enemy, Part 2," he is found and rescued by Speed Sr. and Damien Russ during a raid on the Shadow Committee's Headquarters, but is soon recaptured and targeted for elimination by the committee. He presumably makes his last appearance in "The Shadow World" trilogy when he decides to stay in the alternate dimension he, Speed, X, and Chim-Chim are transported to in order to help the resistance claiming that Speed and X are the true heroes of their home dimension.

Antagonists

Zile Zazic 
Voice Actor: Dave Skigen

A wealthy executive and proprietor of the Racer Academy, Zile Zazic paid for, designed, and built the Academy's virtual track. Despite having founded and built the school alongside the Racer Family, he has a vague and mysterious vendetta against Speed Racer Sr. from long ago. Fans speculate based on several implications in the series that he was once Captain Terror, the leader of Speed Racer's rival team from the original series, and a personal enemy of the elder racer. Once he discovers Speed Jr. has built the Mach 6 from the Mach 5, he becomes his enemy in secret, carrying out undercover hits on him from his lair. Since he is a rich oil tycoon, and the Mach 6's eco-friendly design could ruin his business, he desires the destruction of the Mach 6, and Speed Jr. along with it. It is revealed in "Comet Run, pt. 3" that his full name is Zile Zazic III, which is why he hates coming in third in anything.

Zile is the main cause of Speed Sr.'s disappearance before the beginning of the series. It is revealed during the "Family Reunion" trilogy that he sabotaged the Mach 6 prototype before Speed Sr.'s father-in-law, Tuffie Tredwell, took it to test it in the race against Speed Sr. in the Mach 5. As a result, the car skidded off course, injuring Trixie and killing her father. His actions resulted in Trixie becoming the Shadowy Woman and the CEO of the Shadow Committee, while provoking Speed Sr. to hide Speed Jr. at an orphanage and disappear.

He is revealed to have a much deeper reason for wanting the Mach 6 in "Money Problems", when the Shadow Committee and Trixie are first introduced into the series. Having been hired by them to capture the Mach 6 based on shared interest, he was forced to cooperate or face the threat of assassination. After several botched attempts, Trixie deems him useless and Zile is exposed as a criminal while being targeted for elimination by the Shadow Committee. He is forced to go into hiding, and arrested along with Stan. In "The Hourglass, pt. 1" they are put under house arrest at the Racer Academy. Zile begins searching for clues about the Shadow Committee while serving out his sentence, although he remains paranoid due to their previous attempts to kill him. Despite having only seen the committee as silhouettes on his video phone, he vaguely recognizes several members when seeing them in person.

After Speed Jr. and his friends change the past to prevent Trixie from becoming CEO of the Shadow Committee, they also expose Zile as the person responsible for sabotaging the Mach 6 prototype. Their actions result in Zile being arrested 16 years earlier, causing his wife to divorce him and leave along with an infant Annalise. Although he loses everything, Zile and Stan had forced Conor to reveal that the others are from the future, also learning about the Hourglass Part. In the new timeline created by their interference in the past, Zile appears as a cyborg named the Iron Terror in the present, now bent on making his own Hourglass Part while seeking revenge on the Racer Family for ruining his life.

Trixie Tredwell Racer 

Voice Actor: Mandy Bonhomme (Season 1), Cindy Robinson (Season 2)

In the original series Trixie was Speed Racer's girlfriend, later becoming his wife and the mother of X and Speed Jr. When her husband was first working on the development of the gasless engine, her father, Tuffie Tredwell pressured him into using the prototype in a major race. However, Speed Sr. refused, since it would be too dangerous on ground. Trixie's father ignored the warning and entered it himself, but during the race the car malfunctioned. Speed Sr. tried to save his father-in-law's life but was too late when the prototype Mach 6 skidded off course and exploded, ultimately killing Trixie's father and leaving her permanently scarred both physically and emotionally. Trixie blamed her husband for what happened and became bitter and vengeful with her warped personality and increasingly darker ambitions growing into a full-blown quest for world domination. She inherited her deceased father's multi-national corporation and began using its resources for her own vendetta, thus forming the Shadow Committee. To protect his sons from her twisted influence, Speed Sr. hid them from Trixie and told X that she had died in the accident.

When first introduced in the series, Trixie is always seen hidden in the shadows with her voice altered, even when talking to the rest of the Committee members. Unlike Zile Zazic, Trixie's reasons for wanting the Mach 6 are unrelated to the eco-friendly design. In "The Hourglass, pt. 3" it is also revealed that the Committee knows about the missing part of the Mach 6's engine and are trying to make their own. Although she is clearly interested in the car's time travel capabilities, it isn't specified why.

She is much more ruthless than Zile in her pursuits, especially in "The Hunt for Truth, pt. 2" when she ordered Alpha Academy to be destroyed in order to hide any evidence of the Shadow Committee while showing no sympathy for the people in the school. She has absolutely no regard for even those who have served her in the past and disposes of them as soon as they are no longer of any use to the cause. This is seen through her desire to assassinate Zile Zazic after his failure to secure the Mach 6. Despite his dedication to the cause she also dismisses Handles Mustache, implying that even fellow committee members can be removed once they no longer provide useful service to the group. Having become increasingly more warped over time, she personally hunts down her husband and sons during their attempt to flee from the committee.

After her sons change the past to prevent the accident that made her the leader of the Shadow Committee, Trixie returns to being the loving wife of Speed Sr. and the caring mother of X and Speed. She now lives happily with her family in the new timeline.

Handles Mustache 

Voice Actor: Unknown

The Headmaster of Alpha Academy is a tall man who dresses in cowboy garb and speaks with a stereotypical western accent, yet despite his physical appearance, he is a prominent member of the Shadow Committee, and first member whose face has been seen onscreen. As the leader of Alpha Academy, he tends to the day-to-day running of the school, although the institute is actually owned and operated by the committee itself in order to hide something called "Project: Hourglass" as pointed out by Speed Sr. While he appears easy-going on the surface, Headmaster Mustache is loyal to the Shadow Committee, and is more than willing to use his students to further their plans.

He is first seen as a silhouette in season 1, meeting with the other members of the committee, during which they decide to assassinate Zile Zazic for knowing too much about them in "The Great Escape, pt. 2." His first full appearance in season 2 shows him coordinating plans to steal the Mach 6 while covering up any information that could impede the committee's plans in the "Together We Stand" trilogy. He is also seen reprimanding both his subordinates and students for failure, turning them over to Trixie to receive the proper punishment. After testing out a mysterious device designed to disrupt the systems of the Mach 6 in "The Hunt for Truth, pts. 1 and 2," Trixie deems him of no further use and orders the destruction of Alpha Academy. She allows him a chance to flee as a reward for his loyalty. He does not appear with the other committee members after being dismissed, and is presumably in hiding after getting marked for elimination.

Mr. Pinkyring

Voice Actor: Unknown

First shown as the head of a freelance security team, Mr. Pinkyring is the second member of the Shadow Committee whose face is shown. He is always seen wearing a dark suit and red tie, and has a small flower pinned to his jacket, making him reminiscent of a stereotypical mob boss. Mr. Pinkyring is a large, hulking, middle-aged man with short cut dark hair and a thick square jaw, and his smile is missing several teeth. Although his job within the group is unspecified, he seems to act as an enforcer and plays subordinate to the other members of the Shadow Committee, even referring to Lord Bowler as "boss" at one point.

Mr. Pinkyring is first seen along with the Shadow Committee in season 1 as a silhouette like the others, but he has no lines during their meeting. He makes his first named appearance when Spritle hires a private security team to protect Racer Academy from the threat of the Shadow Committee, although the headmaster is unaware that they actually work for the enemy. Mr. Pinkyring coordinates a mission for his agents to uncover the secrets of the Mach 6, although this attempt ends in failure and his group is removed. He later appears with the rest of the Committee, joining Baron Von Moniacle and Lord Bowler in another effort to capture the Mach 6.

Baron Von Moniacle 

Voice Actor: Unknown

The third member of the Shadow Committee whose face has been seen onscreen, Professor Von Moniacle was first seen among his fellow committee members as a silhouette in season 1. He is a bald man who wears a monocle and speaks in a thick German accent. Moniacle can be arrogant and appears to be somewhat unstable as pointed out by Spritle. Despite his age, he also appears to be a capable physical combatant, as he was able to fight off those much younger with relatively little effort. He's a better fighter than Speed Jr. since Speed Jr. isn't a well train fighter. Unlike Handles Moustache, the professor does not appear to have any legitimate facade and instead works to develop advanced technology for the committee's use while hiding behind the scenes.

The baron makes a brief cameo in Season 1 as a silhouette alongside the other Committee Members, during which he mentions their preference to hide behind legitimate businessmen like Zile Zazic while keeping a stranglehold over the world's economy. He makes a full appearance in "The Hunt for Truth, pt. 3" in Season 2  after the Alpha Academy is destroyed, using his advanced technology and mind control device to turn Alpha Academy's students and Speed Racer Sr. into his brainwashed servants. X destroys the mind control device and frees everyone under its influence, forcing the baron to flee.

Lord Bowler 

Voice Actor: Unknown

The president of a revolutionary car company named RocketAir, Bowler's prestige and resources makes him one of the most influential members of the Shadow Committee, and his company's office building also acts as the meeting place and main headquarters for the group. His usual appearance is that of a British gentleman with a thick grey mustache. He is typically seen wearing a black suit and bowler hat, and speaks in an English accent. Cunning and manipulative, Lord Bowler is placed in charge of a plot to convince X to aid the Shadow Committee, during which he twists words and manipulates events to break the bonds of trust between X and his family.

First appearing as a silhouette alongside the other committee members, he remains silent during the meetings and does not protest against Trixie's decisions. Lord Bowler is named in "Racing With the Enemy, Part 1" in Season 2 when he appears as a sponsor during one of Racer Academy's exhibition races. Using the legitimate facade provided by his company, he offers to sponsor X. He convinces the older Racer brother that the Shadow Committee is only trying to make the world a better place and convinces him to join in their efforts.

Speed Racer: The Next Generation